The Cook County, Illinois, general election was held on November 5, 1996.

Primaries were held March 19, 1996.

Elections were held for Clerk of the Circuit Court, Recorder of Deeds, State's Attorney, three seats on the Water Reclamation District Board, and judgeships on the Circuit Court of Cook County.

Election information
1996 was a presidential election year in the United States. The primaries and general elections for Cook County races coincided with those for federal races (President, House, and Senate) and those for state elections.

Voter turnout

Primary election
Turnout in the primaries was 30.39%, with 776,069 ballots cast. Chicago saw 35.02% turnout and suburban Cook County saw 25.46% turnout.

General election
The general election saw turnout of 64.37%, with 1,774,961 ballots cast. Chicago saw 63.17% turnout (with 902,514 ballots cast), and suburban Cook County saw 65.66% turnout (with 872,447 ballots cast).

Straight-ticket voting
Ballots had a straight-ticket voting option in 1996. This would be the last Cook County election with straight-ticket voting, as it would be abolished in Illinois in 1997.

Clerk of the Circuit Court 

In the 1996 Clerk of the Circuit Court of Cook County election,  incumbent second-term clerk Aurelia Pucinski, a Democrat, was reelected.

Primaries

Democratic

Republican

General election

Recorder of Deeds 

In the 1996 Cook County Recorder of Deeds election, incumbent first-term recorder of deeds Jesse White, a Democrat, was reelected.

Primaries

Democratic

Republican

Harold Washington Party

General election

State's Attorney 

In the 1996 Cook County State's Attorney election, incumbent state's attorney Jack O'Malley, a Republican first elected in a special election in 1990 and subsequently reelected in 1992, was defeated by Democrat Richard A. Devine.

Primaries

Democratic

Republican

Harold Washington Party

General election
Few had seen Devine as having much prospect of unseating O'Malley, a popular incumbent who was regarded as a rising political star. Devine's strong victory over O'Malley was regarded as a very surprising upset.

Devine was regarded as having ridden the coattails of a Democratic wave in Illinois which saw incumbent president Bill Clinton and his vice president Al Gore carry the state by nearly twenty-points in the presidential election and Illinois also elect Dick Durbin in its U.S. Senate election.

Even Devine himself expressed surprise at just how large his margin-of-victory was over O'Malley.

Water Reclamation District Board 

In the 1996 Metropolitan Water Reclamation District of Greater Chicago election, three of the nine seats on the Metropolitan Water Reclamation District of Greater Chicago board were up for election in an at-large election. All three Democratic nominees won election.

Judicial elections 
Pasrtisan elections were held for judgeships on the Circuit Court of Cook County due to vacancies. Retention elections were also held for the Circuit Court.

Partisan elections were also held for subcircuit courts judgeships due to vacancies. Retention elections were held for other judgeships.

Other elections
Coinciding with the primaries, elections were held to elect both the Democratic, Republican, and Harold Washington Party committeemen for the wards of Chicago.

See also 
 1996 Illinois elections

References 

Cook County
Cook County, Illinois elections
Cook County 1996
Cook County
Cook County, Illinois elections